Hjelmsøya is an island in Måsøy Municipality in Troms og Finnmark county, Norway. The  island lies west of the islands of Måsøya and Magerøya, north of Havøya and the mainland, and east of Ingøya. The mountainous island has been uninhabited since 1967. There are connections to the island other than by private boats.

Nature reserves
There are two large nature reserves on the island. The northernmost part of Hjelmsøya has a large bird cliff called Hjelmsøystauren, which is one of Norway's most important breeding colonies of guillemots. It has been designated an Important Bird Area (IBA) by BirdLife International. The other one is at Sandsfjord, a fjord surrounded by high mountain cliffs.

See also
List of islands of Norway

References

Måsøy
Islands of Troms og Finnmark
Nature reserves in Norway
Important Bird Areas of Norway
Important Bird Areas of Arctic islands
Seabird colonies